Sai is a commune in the Orne department in north-western France. It has a population of 222. Its inhabitants are known as Sayiens (male) and Sayiennes (female).

Toponymy 
The name of the village has been found under the forms: Saium in 1086, See et Zee in 1207, Saieum in 1223, Sav in 1418.

See also
Communes of the Orne department

References

External links 
 

Communes of Orne